Morristown, Nova Scotia my refer to:

Morristown, Kings County, Nova Scotia
Morristown, Antigonish County